Sedhavi Mudiyanselage Damitha Buddhini Abeyratne Bandara (born September 14, 1975), popularly as Damitha Abeyratne, is a Sri Lankan film and teledrama actress.

Biography
She schooled at Samudradevi Balika Vidyalaya, Nugegoda and St. Paul’s Girls School, Milagiriya.

Career
In 1987, she made her acting debut as an eight-year-old in the teledrama Passe Gena Manamali and later appeared in her first film Meeharaka directed by I. Hewawasam in 1993. However, she only played a significant role with Inoka Sathyangani's  2003 film   Sulang Kirilli. This won her the Sarasaviya Best Actress Award, SIGNIS Best Actress Award and many other international awards. She was also won awards for the dramatic roles of Dandubasnamanaya television series and Mee Haraka film.

Abeyratne plays her debut role as director with the teledrama serial Sasara Sarani, where she is the producer as well.

Abeyratne also played as main role in Batti teledrama, which broadcast on ITN

Notable television works

 Ambu Daruwo
 Ammai Thaththai
 Anantha
 Apuru Sahodaraya
 Batti
 Bharyawo
 Bhavana - Thunkal Mayawa
 Bhavathra
 Chakrandi
 Dandubasnamanaya
 Depath Nai
 Deveni Athmaya
 Hada Pudasuna 
 Ingi Bingi
 Issaraha Gedara
 Jodu Gedara
 Kokila Ginna
 Kiripabalu Vila 
 Nedeyo
 Nisala Diya Sasala Viya
 Nisala Vilthera
 Passe Gena Manamali
 Pata Sarungal
 Pork Veediya 
 Prakampana
 Rathi Virathi 
 Raththarana Neth
 Rejina
 Ridee Tharaka
 Sadisi Tharanaya 
 Sahas Gaw Dura
 Salsapuna
 Sanda Dev Diyani 
 Sandagira 
 Sasara Sarani
 Senehewanthayo
 Sihinaya Wasanthayak
 Sikuru Wasanthe
 Situwarayo
 Sulanga Maha Meraka
 Sulangata Madivee
 Suwanda Obai Amme
 Swayanjatha
 Varana Kambili
 Wala Wettuwa
 Wansakkarayo

Controversy
In 2013, fellow actress Semini Iddamalgoda sued Abeyratne for Rs 50 million having allegedly defamed her during an interview with a Ran FM radio channel on January 13, 2013. In 2014, Abeyratne demanded Rs. 100 million as damages from Iddamalgoda for allegedly defaming her. The case was taken at the Colombo District Court on 24 February 2014. On 14 October 2014, both withdrew their civil suits.

On 5 November 2015, she was asked to make a statement due to a complaint on fraud and corruption at Sri Lanka Airlines. She went to Presidential Commission of Inquiry to Investigate and Inquire into Serious Acts of Fraud, Corruption and Abuse of Power and State Resources and Privileges (PRECIFAC) and made a statement regarding a irregularity in food supply for a show.

Filmography

Awards and accolades
She has won several awards at the local theater, television and film festivals. 
2005 - Vishva Keerthi Award For Winning Two International Awards for film Sulang kirilli
2005 - Outstanding Young Personality Junior Chamber Sri Lanka for the contribution to the Art

SIGNIS OCIC Awards

|-
|| 1995 ||| Dandubasnamanaya || Best Actress || 
|-
|| 2003 ||| Sulang Kirilli || Best Actress || 
|-
|| 2010 ||| Dakina Dakina Mal || Best Actress ||

Swarna Sanka Awards

|-
|| 1995 ||| Mee Haraka || Best Supporting Actress ||

Presidential Film Awards

|-
|| 2005 ||| Sulang Kirilli || Best Actress ||

Sarasaviya Awards

|-
|| 1996 ||| Mee Haraka || Merit Award || 
|-
|| 2004 ||| Sulang Kirilli || Best Actress || 
|-
|| 2015 ||| Pravegaya || Best Supporting Actress ||

Sumathi Awards

|-
|| 2006 ||| Keli Madala || Best Actress Award ||

Dhaka International Film Festival

|-
|| 2004 ||| Sulang Kirilli || Best Actress Award ||

Tamil Nadu International Film Festival

|-
|| 2004 ||| Sulang Kirilli || Best Actress Award ||

Raigam Tele'es

|-
|| 2012 ||| Swayanjatha || Best Actress ||

References

External links
 Damitha Abeyratne's Biography in Sinhala Cinema Database

National Film Corporation of Sri Lanka - Official Website

"Sulang Kirilli" (Sinhalese)
Sathyangani of "Wind bird's" fame claims wings
Artistes airs their views in ‘Sundara Sandawe’
Padmasiri: Two different feilds
මාව එක එක අයට විවාහ කරලා දුන්නා
Wedding of Damitha

Living people
Sri Lankan film actresses
20th-century Sri Lankan actresses
21st-century Sri Lankan actresses
Sri Lankan television actresses
1975 births